Taishan District is a district of the city of Tai'an in the Chinese province of Shandong.

Administrative divisions
As 2012, this district is divided to 5 subdistricts, 2 towns and 1 township.
Subdistricts

Towns
Shengzhuang
Qiujiadian

Townships
Dajinkou Township

References

External links 
 Information page

County-level divisions of Shandong
Tai'an